The 2015 Humboldt State Lumberjacks football team represented Humboldt State University during the 2015 NCAA Division II football season. Humboldt State competed in the Great Northwest Athletic Conference (GNAC).

The 2015 Lumberjacks were led by eighth-year head coach Rob Smith. They played home games at the Redwood Bowl in Arcata, California. Humboldt State finished the regular season ranked #11 in the Division II poll, as GNAC champion, with a record of nine wins and one loss (9–1, 6–0 GNAC).

Humboldt State was invited to play in the postseason for the first time since 1968. They played the first game of the Division II playoffs in their home stadium, defeating #24  by a score of 45–31. In the second round, they were defeated by eventual champion, #1 Northwest Missouri State in Maryville, Missouri by a score of 7–54. This brought the team's final record to ten wins and two losses (10–2, 6–0 GNAC). The postseason ranking for the team was #16. The ten wins ties is one short of the team's all-time mark, set in 1960 with 11 victories. The Lumberjacks outscored their opponents 468–238 for the 2015 season, with an average score of 45–14 in their ten wins.

Schedule

References

Humboldt State
Humboldt State Lumberjacks football seasons
Great Northwest Athletic Conference football champion seasons
Humboldt State Lumberjacks football